Oedaspis nyx is a species of tephritid or fruit flies in the genus Oedaspis of the family Tephritidae.

Distribution
Madagascar.

References

Tephritinae
Insects described in 1992
Diptera of Africa